Ron Aiken (born August 18, 1955) is an American football coach. He was recently the defensive line coach for the Arizona Hotshots of the Alliance of American Football. He was the defensive line coach at the University of Oregon from 2013 to 2016.

Education and playing career
Aiken was a starting offensive lineman for North Carolina A&T from 1974 to 1977. He earned a Bachelor's degree in history from North Carolina A&T in 1977. Aiken proceeded to earn his master's degree in secondary education from The Citadel in 1982.

Coaching career
Aiken won the AFCA Division I FBS Assistant Coach of the Year Award  in 2002.

Head coaching record

College

References

1955 births
Living people
American football defensive linemen
Arizona Cardinals coaches
Arizona Hotshots coaches
Bethany Swedes football coaches
Iowa Hawkeyes football coaches
Langston Lions football coaches
New Mexico Lobos football coaches
North Carolina A&T Aggies football players
Oregon Ducks football coaches
RPI Engineers football coaches
San Diego State Aztecs football coaches
Texas Longhorns football coaches
Tarkio Owls football coaches
Vanderbilt Commodores football coaches
High school football coaches in Virginia
The Citadel, The Military College of South Carolina alumni
People from Moncks Corner, South Carolina
African-American coaches of American football
African-American players of American football